KMVS may refer to:

 KMVS (FM), a radio station (89.3 FM) licensed to serve Moss Beach, California, United States
 a radio station in the computer game The Movies